Guimarães is a city and municipality in Portugal.

Guimarães may also refer to:

Guimarães (surname)
Guimarães, Maranhão, municipality in Brazil
Guimarães RUFC, rugby team
Vitória de Guimarães, Portuguese professional football club

See also
 Guima (disambiguation)
 Guimaras (disambiguation)